The German composer Ludwig van Beethoven (1770–1827) is among the most admired composers in the history of Western music, and has been the subject of many private and public sculptures, including busts, reliefs, statues and others. The first, a bust by Franz Klein, was commissioned by Johann Andreas Streicher and created in 1812, while the composer was still alive. After Beethoven's death in 1827, his hometown, Bonn, immediately began planning a monument for the following year, though a cholera outbreak delayed this. A design competition was eventually held, in which a submission by Ernst Julius Hähnel beat ones from Friedrich von Amerling, Gustav Blaeser and Friedrich Drake. In 1845, Hähnel's monument was erected, due to finances given by Robert Schumann, Charles Hallé, George Thomas Smart and especially Franz Liszt. While the monument's height and simplicity were criticized, the reliefs surrounding the base were met with public approval.

The Beethoven monuments that followed Hähnel's, while retaining a high pedestal, began to portray the composer in a less simplistic and increasingly heroic light. The city had intended to erect a monument for Beethoven since his death, but serious action to do so began only in the 1870s, when a competition for a design was held and Zumbusch's winning design was created with financial support from Liszt and Brahms. 

In the early 20th century, the glorified portrayals of Beethoven reached their peak, with god-like representations such as Max Klinger's monument (1902), unveiled at the Vienna Secession (now in the Museum der bildenden Künste), and Fidus's unexecuted design for a 'Beethoven temple' (1903). Also at this time, Antoine Bourdelle and Naoum Aronson, both students of Auguste Rodin, began creating busts of the composer; Bourdelle was especially prolific. As the century progressed, ideas on depicting Beethoven became largely ununified, and were often especially allegorical, such as Theodor von Gosen's monument in Alameda Central, Mexico City (1921). In 1926, Berlin hosted a monument competition in preparation for the composer's 100th anniversary the following year; the entire competition was controversial and was eventually canceled due to criticism from the press and the committee's inability to form a consensus. There had been submissions from famous sculptors including Ernst Barlach, Peter Breuer and Georg Kolbe, although Breuer and Kolbe eventually had their designs constructed in 1938 and 1948 respectively. After World War II, experimentation in portraying Beethoven increased even further, exemplified by  three-dimensonal reproduction (1986) of Joseph Karl Stieler's painted portrait and Markus Lüpertz's controversial abstract portrayal (2014).

Sculptures

Bourdelle's sculptures
The French sculptor Antoine Bourdelle (1861–1929) greatly admired Beethoven, of whom he created at least 45 sculptures from 1893 to the end of his life.

Unexecuted sculptures

See also

Notes

References
General
 

Specific

External links
 A slideshow of depictions of Beethoven from the Deutsches Historisches Museum on Google Arts & Culture

Beethoven